Chahkanduk (also Romanized as Chāhkandūk and Chāh Kandūk; also known as Chah Kandook Nahar Khan) is a village in Naharjan Rural District, Mud District, Sarbisheh County, South Khorasan Province, Iran. At the 2006 census, its population was 66, in 32 families.

References 

Populated places in Sarbisheh County